Jeni Mundy FREng (born in 1965) currently a non-executive board member at Auto Trader. She emigrated from the UK to New Zealand in 1994 with a master’s in electronic engineering and began her telecoms career with Bellsouth as an RF engineer. By 2001 she was head of the technology team at Vodafone New Zealand (after the UK carrier bought up Bellsouth in 1998). She moved to the UK CTO position in 2007., ending her Vodafone career with Group Enterprise Director of Products and Innovations.

Mundy was elected a Fellow of the Royal Academy of Engineering in 2011.

She is one of the few women to compete twice in the Volvo Ocean Race 1989-90 on Maiden and 1993-94 on US Women's Challenge/Heineken.

References

1965 births
Living people
Fellows of the Royal Academy of Engineering
Female Fellows of the Royal Academy of Engineering
Volvo Ocean Race sailors
British female sailors (sport)
21st-century women engineers